The World of Null-A, sometimes written The World of Ā, is a 1948 science fiction novel by Canadian-American writer A. E. van Vogt. It was originally published as a three-part serial in 1945 in Astounding Stories. It incorporates concepts from the General Semantics of Alfred Korzybski.  The name Ā refers to non-Aristotelian logic.

Plot summary
Gilbert Gosseyn (pronounced go sane), a man living in an apparent utopia where those with superior understanding and mental control rule the rest of humanity, wants to be tested by the giant Machine that determines such superiority. However, he finds that his memories are false.  In his search for his real identity, he discovers that he has extra bodies that are activated when he dies (so that, in a sense, he cannot be killed), that a galactic society of humans exists outside the Solar system, a large interstellar empire wishes to conquer both the Earth and Venus (inhabited by masters of non-Aristotelian logic), and he has extra brain matter that, when properly trained, can allow him to move matter with his mind.

Publication history
The novel originally appeared as a serial entitled "The World of Ā" in the August 1945 to October 1945 issues of the magazine Astounding Science Fiction, which was edited by John W. Campbell, Jr.

Van Vogt significantly revised and shortened the tale for the 1948 novel release.  Like the serial, the 1948 hardcover (Simon & Schuster) and the 1950 hardcover (Grosset & Dunlap) editions were entitled The World of Ā.  To reduce printing costs, the 1953 and 1964 Ace Books paperback editions were entitled The World of Null-A, and the symbol Ā was replaced with "null-A" throughout the text. The 1970 revision kept this change, added some brief new passages to chapters 10, 24, and 35, and also included a new introduction in which van Vogt defended the controversial work, but also admitted that the original serial had been flawed.

Critical reception

It won the Manuscripters Club Award. It was listed by the New York area library association among the hundred best novels of 1948. World of Null-A has been translated into nine languages, and when first published, created the French Science Fiction Market all by itself - according to Jacques Sadoul, editor of Editions OPTA.  The World of Null-A finished second in the Retro Hugo award voting for Best Novel of 1945 presented in 1996 at L.A.con III.

For many years, two quotes appeared on the paperback editions of this novel.  "Without doubt one of the most exciting, continuously complex and richly patterned science fiction novels ever written!" - Groff Conklin; and "One of those once-in-a-decade classics!" - John Campbell.

In 1945, the novel was the subject of an extended critical essay by fellow author and critic Damon Knight.  In the review, which was later expanded into "Cosmic Jerrybuilder: A. E. van Vogt", Knight writes that "far from being a 'classic' by any reasonable standard, The World of Ā is one of the worst allegedly-adult science fiction stories ever published."  Knight criticizes the novel on four main levels: 

In his author's introduction to the 1970 revised edition, van Vogt acknowledges that he has taken Knight's criticisms seriously, thus the reason for his revising the novel so many years after its original publication.

In 1974 Damon Knight walked back his original criticisms:

Sequels
The World of Null-A was followed by the sequel, The Pawns of Null-A (also known as The Players of Null-A) (1956), and much later by a follow-up, Null-A Three (1984).

In 2008 John C. Wright wrote a new chapter to the story of Gilbert Gosseyn, Null-A Continuum, in the style of van Vogt.

References

External links 
 
 The World of Null-A as serialized in Astounding Science Fiction, parts one, two, and three at the Internet Archive

1948 American novels
1948 science fiction novels
American philosophical novels
General semantics
Non-classical logic
Novels by A. E. van Vogt
Novels first published in serial form
Simon & Schuster books
Works originally published in Analog Science Fiction and Fact